Joel Gabriel Muñoz Castillo (born June 24, 1980) is a Panamanian professional basketball player who plays for the Dragones de Don Bosco of the LPB Panama He is also a member of the Panama men's national basketball team. 

Muñoz has played professional basketball in Panama, Uruguay, Brazil, and Mexico since beginning his career with Tumba Muerto Colosos in the Panama National Basketball League in 2000. In his most recent season, he averaged 4.3 points and 4.2 assists per game with Potros ITSON in the Mexican Liga Nacional de Baloncesto Profesional.

Muñoz is also a member of the Panama men's national basketball team. He competed with the team at the FIBA Americas Championship in 2005, 2007, and 2009; Centrobasket in 2008; and the COCABA Championship in 2004 and 2009. He averaged 10 points, 4.2 rebounds and 4 assists per game

References

1980 births
Living people
Sportspeople from Panama City
Panamanian men's basketball players
Pan American Games competitors for Panama
Basketball players at the 2007 Pan American Games
Club Athletico Paulistano basketball players
Correcaminos de Colón players
Panamanian expatriate basketball people in Mexico
Potros ITSON de Obregón players